Jordi de Sant Jordi (late 1390s – c. 1424) was a Valencian poet and knight. Along with his contemporary Ausiàs March, Sant Jordi was among the earliest and most representative figures of the so-called Valencian Golden Age, one of the peak periods of the Catalan literature. He was patronised by Queen-Dowager Margarida of Aragon-Prades, widow of King Martí I.

Sant Jordi was born in the Kingdom of Valencia, the son of a freed morisco slave. He was Chamberlain at the court of King Alfons V of Aragon (Alfons III of Valencia) but he is best known for his poetry.

Sant Jordi took part in King Alfonso's expedition to the Kingdom of Naples, where he was captured by the forces of Francesco Sforza on 30 May 1423. During his captivity, he wrote one of his best-known poems, 'Prisoner'.

He died around 1424. Among later writers who appear to draw from his work is Joan Roís de Corella. Iñigo López de Mendoza's work The Coronation of Lord Jordi is dedicated to him.

References

  Pujol-Gomez, J, "Jordi de Saint Jordi" in Gauvard, C., de Libera, A. & Zink, M. (eds), Dictionnaire du Moyen Âge. Paris: PUF/Quadrige, 2nd edn, 2004.

Further reading
  Riquer, Marti de, and Badia, Lola, Les poesies de Jordi de Sant Jordi, cavaller valencia del segle XV.  Valencia: Tres i Quatre, 1984.

External links
 
 

1390s births
1424 deaths
Writers from the Valencian Community
Medieval Catalan-language writers
15th-century Spanish writers
15th-century Spanish poets
Catalan-language poets
Spanish poets
Spanish male poets
15th-century people from the Kingdom of Aragon